Aruek is a Torricelli language of Papua New Guinea. There is little data to classify it, and it is therefore left unclassified within Torricelli by Ross (2005). There are no longer any speakers in the one village where it was spoken and people of that village say the language is now extinct.

References

Torricelli languages
Languages of Sandaun Province
Languages of East Sepik Province